Yehia Emam (1 May 1919 – 1997), was an Egyptian footballer who played as a goalkeeper for Zamalek. He also played for the Egyptian national team, and represented his country in the 1948 Summer Olympics, 1951 Mediterranean Games and 1953 Pan Arab Games.

Honours
Zamalek SC
Egypt Cup: (5)
 1937–38, 1940–41, 1942–43, 1943–44, 1951–52
Cairo League: (10)
 1939–40, 1940–41, 1943–44, 1944–45, 1945–46, 1946–47, 1948–49, 1950–51, 1951–52, 1952–53

Personal life
He is father of the Zamalek legend Hamada Emam and grandfather of Hazem Emam.

References

External links

Egyptian footballers
Egypt international footballers
Zamalek SC players
Olympic footballers of Egypt
Footballers at the 1948 Summer Olympics
1919 births
1997 deaths
Association football goalkeepers
Emam family
Footballers at the 1951 Mediterranean Games
Mediterranean Games competitors for Egypt
20th-century Egyptian people